Blackstone Valley Regional Vocational Technical High School, or BVT for short, is a technical high school in Upton, Massachusetts, serving the thirteen towns of the Blackstone Valley. The school was established in 1964. The school offers eighteen technical programs that students can enroll in to learn more about that trade. 

The original school colors were purple and gold.

Demographics 
BVT is a technical school that serve grades nine through twelve. BVT is located in Upton, Massachusetts. BVT has a total of 1,185 students. 52% of the students are females and 48% of the students are males. Ethnicity rate is 94% non-Hispanic white, 3% Hispanic/Latino, 1% black, 1% Asian, 0.1% Hawaiian Native, and 2% other. There are 93 teachers that include a 13:1 ratio. The graduation rate from BVT is 99% which is a high graduation rate than a normal high school.

For the students who eat lunch 11% of the students get free lunch while 3% of the students get reduced lunch.

BVT offers Ap courses such as AP Chem, Spanish  Language & Culture, Physics, English Literature & Composition, US History, Biology, Calculus, and Computer Science. Only  56% of students took an AP course and took the AP Test but only 51% of the students passed the test. Only 39% of the students have a  passing rate, and only 28% have a quality adjustment participation rate.

School district
The school serves thirteen towns in the Blackstone Valley:

Vocational programs
Blackstone Valley Tech offers eighteen vocational programs, called "shops,":

Athletics
The BVT mascot is the Beavers. The BVT football team has won three state championships. The first state championship occurred on December 1, 2007, when BVT defeated Dean Tech 37–8 in the 3A Central-Western Massachusetts Super Bowl at Westfield State. The second state championship occurred on December 1, 2012, when BVT defeated Bay Path Regional Vocational Technical High School 6–0 in the Division 6 Central Massachusetts Super Bowl at Worcester State. The third state championship occurred on December 1, 2018, when BVT defeated St. Mary's of Lynn 18–0 in the Division 7 Massachusetts State Championship Game at Gillette Stadium. During the 2017 Football Season, BVT lost in the 2017 Massachusetts State Championship Game to Mashpee 22–16 at Gillette Stadium. During both the 2017 and 2018 BVT Football Seasons the Beavers played in honor of their defensive line coach Derek Yancik, who died on May 14, 2018, after a long battle with pancreatic cancer. Before being diagnosed with cancer, Coach Yancik had been a long-time member of the BVT Football coaching staff and also served as an HVAC Shop teacher at BVT.

See also 
 List of high schools in Massachusetts

References

External links
 School Website
 Town of Upton, Massachusetts website

Schools in Worcester County, Massachusetts
Public high schools in Massachusetts